Arnhem Velperpoort is a railway station located in Arnhem, Netherlands. The station was opened on 1 October 1893, closed on 3 June 1918 and reopened on 5 January 1953. It is located on the Arnhem–Leeuwarden railway and the Oberhausen–Arnhem railway. The train services are operated by Nederlandse Spoorwegen, Arriva and Breng. Previously, the name of the station was just Velperpoort (1893-1918).

Train services

Bus services

Gallery

External links
NS website 
Dutch Public Transport journey planner 

Velperpoort
Railway stations opened in 1893
Railway stations closed in 1918
Railway stations opened in 1953
Railway stations on the Staatslijn A
Railway stations on the IJssellijn
Railway stations on the Rhijnspoorweg
1893 establishments in the Netherlands
Railway stations in the Netherlands opened in the 19th century